The Country Girl / Little Boy Lost is a Decca Records album by Bing Crosby of songs from the Paramount films Little Boy Lost and The Country Girl. This is not a soundtrack recording album but the songs used in the films were separately recorded for commercial release. It was issued as a 10” LP with catalog No.DL 5556. The songs from The Country Girl were also issued on an extended play record numbered ED-2156 and all of the songs from both films were used in the 15-part Bing’s Hollywood series issued by Decca in 1962.

Background
Bing Crosby had moved away from his familiar light comedy musical roles in the 1950s and undertaken two dramatic roles in Little Boy Lost and The Country Girl. Neither of the films was a musical but each had songs which helped to move the action along. The song “Violets and Violins” was not sung by Crosby in the former film but by his wife played by Nicole Maurey.

Track listing for 10" LP

References 

Bing Crosby albums
Decca Records albums
1955 albums